50 cents is a coinage value in many systems using decimal currencies.

Examples include:
 Australian fifty-cent coin
 50-cent piece (Canadian coin)
 50 euro cent coin
 Half dollar (United States coin)
 Half guilder coin (Netherlands)
 Hong Kong fifty-cent coin

See also
50 Cent (disambiguation)